Saint Alexander may refer to one of several saints including:

Pope Alexander I (died 115), saint and pope
See Epipodius and Alexander for Saint Alexander, martyred in Lyon, 178 AD
Alexander of Rome (died c. 289), Christian martyr
Alexander of Bergamo (died c. 303), patron saint of Bergamo; may have been a Roman soldier
Alexander of Constantinople (born between 237 and 244–337), bishop of Byzantium and the bishop of Constantinople
Alexander of Jerusalem (d. 251 AD), venerated as a Martyr and Saint by Eastern Orthodox Churches & Roman Catholic Church
Alexander Nevsky (1220–1263), Grand Prince of Novgorod and Vladimir 
Alexander Sauli, the "Apostle of Corsica", (1535–1592), member of an illustrious Lombard family 
Alexander of Comana (died 251), bishop of Comana
Pope Alexander I of Alexandria, Patriarch of Alexandria
Alexander Svirsky (1448–1533), Eastern Orthodox saint, monk and hegumen of Russian Orthodox Church
One of the seven sons of Felicitas of Rome (101–165)
Sisinnius, Martyrius and Alexander (died 405), martyrs
Saint Alexander, a companion of St. Victor of Marseilles (died 290)
Alexander Schmorell (1917–1943), member of the White Rose